Jiří Jakeš (born October 4, 1982) is a Czech former professional ice hockey player.

Jakeš began his career as a product of HC Sparta Praha's academy before moving to the junior Canadian Hockey League where he was drafted 14th overall by the Western Hockey League's Brandon Wheat Kings in the 2000 CHL Import Draft. In his first season he played in the CHL Top Prospects Game after scoring 22 goals in 64 games. He would then be drafted by the Boston Bruins, 147th overall, in the 2001 NHL Entry Draft though he never managed to play in the NHL.

Jakeš had a short spell in the West Coast Hockey League for the Anchorage Aces in 2002 before returning to the WHL with the Tri-City Americans and the Vancouver Giants. After failing to secure a North American contract, Jakeš returned to the Czech Republic and played fourteen games in the 2003–04 Czech Extraliga season, thirteen with HC Sparta Praha and one with HC Lasselsberger Plzeň. He would then spend the remainder of his career in the Czech 1.liga and Czech 2.liga, including spending the last eight years of his career with HC Kobra Praha.

Jakeš was also a member of the Czech Republic squad in the 2002 World Junior Ice Hockey Championships.

Career statistics

Regular season and playoffs

International

References

External links

1982 births
Living people
Anchorage Aces players
HC Benátky nad Jizerou players
Boston Bruins draft picks
Brandon Wheat Kings players
Czech ice hockey right wingers
HC Kobra Praha players
BK Mladá Boleslav players
IHC Písek players
HC Plzeň players
HC Sparta Praha players
Ice hockey people from Prague
Tri-City Americans players
Vancouver Giants players
Czech expatriate ice hockey players in the United States
Czech expatriate ice hockey players in Canada